This is a list of mayors of West Valley City, Utah, USA. West Valley City was incorporated on July 1, 1980. The mayor of West Valley City is a non-partisan position in a council-manager government.

West Valley City